Shebalino (Şabalin) is a rural locality (a selo) and the administrative center of Shebalinsky District of the Altai Republic, Russia. Population:

References

Notes

Sources

Rural localities in Shebalinsky District